Cirrhilabrus ryukyuensis is a wrasse from the western Pacific Ocean from Indonesia, Malaysia and the Philippines north to Japan. It occasionally makes its way into the aquarium trade. It grows to a size of 15 cm in length. SOme authorities regard this taxon as a synonym of Cirrhilabrus cyanopleura, but Fishbase and the Catalog of Fishes treat it as a valid species. This species was called Cirrhilabrus lyukyuensis but this is treated as a misspelling.

References

External links
 

ryukyuensis
Fish described in 1904
Taxobox binomials not recognized by IUCN